Coccinella prolongata, the prolongate lady beetle, is a species of lady beetle in the family Coccinellidae. It is found in North America.

Subspecies
These three subspecies belong to the species Coccinella prolongata:
 Coccinella prolongata bridwelli Nunenmacher, 1913
 Coccinella prolongata prolongata Crotch, 1873
 Coccinella prolongata sequoiae Dobzhansky, 1931

References

Further reading

 

Coccinellidae
Articles created by Qbugbot
Beetles described in 1869